Allopetrolisthes is a genus of porcelain crabs, comprising three species:
Allopetrolisthes angulosus (Guérin, 1835)
Allopetrolisthes punctatus (Guérin, 1835)
Allopetrolisthes spinifrons (H. Milne-Edwards, 1837)

References

Porcelain crabs